Stephen Schultz (born December 7, 1987) is a retired American professional ice hockey player. He last played for the Nottingham Panthers of the UK EIHL.

On February 23, 2013, Schultz tied an ECHL single-game record when he scored four power-play goals to lead the Trenton Titans to a 6–0 win over the Reading Royals.

After a single high scoring season in the German DEL2 with ESV Kaufbeuren, Schultz returned to North America and signed a one-year contract with the Orlando Solar Bears of the ECHL on August 7, 2014. Prior to the 2014-15 season, Schultz was claimed off waivers by the Wichita Thunder on October 21, 2014.

References

External links

1987 births
American men's ice hockey right wingers
Binghamton Senators players
Colorado College Tigers men's ice hockey players
ESV Kaufbeuren players
Ice hockey players from New York (state)
Lincoln Stars players
Living people
Nottingham Panthers players
People from Westbury, New York
Texas Stars players
Trenton Titans players
Wichita Thunder players